Islamia College may refer to:

Islamia College, Gujranwala, Gujranwala, Pakistan
Government Islamia College, Lahore, Pakistan
Government Islamia College, Chiniot, Pakistan
Amiruddaula Islamia Degree College, Lucknow, India
Islamia College University, Peshawar, Pakistan
Islamia Science College, Karachi, Pakistan
Original name of Maulana Azad College, Kolkata, India